Laurent Groppi (born 19 January 1983 in Haute-Savoie, Thonon-les-Bains) is a French racing driver.

He won the Formula Campus by Renault and Elf in 2003 and the Championnat de France Formula Renault 2.0 in 2006. He also competed in Eurocup Formula Renault 2.0. In 2007 he finished second in the French GT Championship and finished 5th in the GT1 Class of the 2007 24 Hours of Le Mans driving a Team ORECA Saleen S7R.

He returned to Oreca for the 2008 24 Hours of Le Mans, but this time finished 8th in LMP1 class in their Judd powered Courage-Oreca LC70. In 2009 he finished 5th in the Le Mans Series GT1 Class with Larbre Competition in their Saleen S7R. In 2010 he won the French GT Championship with Larbre in their Porsche 911 GT3.

24 Hours of Le Mans results

External links
 Career statistics from Driver Database

1983 births
Living people
French racing drivers
Sportspeople from Haute-Savoie
German Formula Renault 2.0 drivers
French Formula Renault 2.0 drivers
Formula Renault Eurocup drivers
French F4 Championship drivers
24 Hours of Le Mans drivers
European Le Mans Series drivers

Formule Campus Renault Elf drivers
Oreca drivers
Larbre Compétition drivers
La Filière drivers
Graff Racing drivers